The Logia Unión y Ampara No. 44, or Logia Masónica de Caguas is a masonic lodge located in Caguas, Puerto Rico which was built in 1923 and listed in the National Register of Historic Places on June 15, 1988.

History and description
According to historians of freemasonry, somewhere between 1873 and 1875 the  had a member named Jose Ramos de Anaya who went on to serve as Grand Master from 1903 to 1904 in Puerto Rico.

The privately owned lodge, designed by Antonin Nechodoma, was listed in the National Register of Historic Places on June 15, 1988. The lodge features a Greek Revival architecture style and is made of concrete. As of June 15, 1988 it still maintained its function as a meeting place for freemasons.

Gallery

References

		
1923 establishments in Puerto Rico
Masonic buildings completed in 1923
Clubhouses on the National Register of Historic Places in Puerto Rico
Neoclassical architecture in Puerto Rico
Caguas, Puerto Rico